URL Snooper is a program to find URLs of streaming media and data. This allows streamed files download through any download manager. Its scope is the same as that of a stream recorder. It usually uses library such as pcap/Winpcap for packet capturing .

See also
Comparison of download managers

External links 

All streaming media recording software
PyURLSnooper is OS independent and open source (uses pcapy for packet capturing)

Network analyzers
URL
Web software